Thomas Sergeant Hall (23 December 1858 – 21 December 1915) was an Australian geologist and biologist, recipient of The Murchison Fund in 1901.

Early life
Hall was born in Geelong, the son of Thomas March Hall, a business man originally from Lincolnshire, England and Elizabeth, née Walshe, from Dublin. Hall was educated at the Geelong Grammar School where he came under the influence of James L. Cuthbertson. He was a junior master at Wesley College in 1879–80, then Hawthorn College and then went to the University of Melbourne, where he took his B.A. degree in 1886 with honours in natural science. This included work in palaeontology under Sir Frederick McCoy. Hall taught for a year at Girton College, Sandhurst (now Bendigo) in 1887, but returned to the university and did a three years' course in biology under Professor Sir Baldwin Spencer.

Career
Hall took a leading part in the forming of the university science club, and through it met Dr G. B. Pritchard with whom he was later to do valuable work in geology. Hall was a successful director of the Castlemaine school of mines from 1890 to 1893, and in the latter year became lecturer in biology at Melbourne university. Hall held this position until his death but found time for many other activities.

In 1899 Hall published a Catalogue of the Scientific and Technical Periodical Literature in the Libraries of Victoria. A second and enlarged edition, in which he was assisted by Mr E. R. Pitt of the public library, Melbourne, appeared in 1911. He did much valuable work for the Field Naturalists Club of Victoria (president 1901–1903), the Royal Society of Victoria, and the Australian and New Zealand Association for the Advancement of Science. His Victorian Hill and Dale (1909), describing the geology of the country around Melbourne, is a model book of popular science, written without a trace of scientific jargon; there is barely a technical term in its 150 pages. He did not write a large number of papers, but his work on the graptolite rocks of Victoria led to his being made the recipient of The Murchison Fund of the Geological Society of London in 1901. One of his major discoveries was the key to the unravelling of the complex Ordovician sequence.

Family 
He married Miss Eva Lucie Annie Hill on 21 December 1891, who survived him along with three sons and a daughter.

Legacy
Hall became ill early in 1915, but carried on his work until shortly before his death from chronic nephritis on 21 December 1915. He was given the honorary degree of D.Sc. by Melbourne University in 1908. Hall's work with Dr Pritchard on the tertiary fossiliferous strata of Victoria, and his own work on the graptolite rocks of Victoria gives him a permanent place in the history of Australian geology.

References

Thomas A. Darragh, 'Hall, Thomas Sergeant (1858 - 1915)', Australian Dictionary of Biography, Volume 9, MUP, 1983, pp 166–167. Retrieved 20 January 2009

1858 births
1915 deaths
Australian biologists
Geologists from Melbourne
Academic staff of the University of Melbourne
People educated at Geelong Grammar School